Zacholitikos (also Δερβένιος - Dervenios) is a small river in the western part of Corinthia, Greece. The source of the river is in the mountains near Evrostina. It empties into the Gulf of Corinth east of Derveni.

References
The first version of the article is translated from the article at the Greek Wikipedia (Main page)

Landforms of Corinthia
Rivers of Greece
Rivers of Peloponnese (region)
Drainage basins of the Gulf of Corinth